Caroline Wozniacki was the four-time defending champion. She retired in the semifinals against Maria Kirilenko.

Petra Kvitová defeated Kirilenko 7–6(11–9), 7–5 in the final.

Seeds
The top two seeds receive a bye into the second round.

Draw

Finals

Top half

Bottom half

Qualifying

Seeds

Qualifiers

Lucky losers 
  Vera Dushevina
  Melanie Oudin

Draw

First qualifier

Second qualifier

Third qualifier

Fourth qualifier

External links
 WTA tournament draws

2012 WTA Tour
Singles